Thu Ngal is a 2017 Burmese drama film, directed by Pwint Theingi Zaw starring Yan Aung, Ye Aung, Min Oo, Kyaw Htet Aung, Soe Myat Thuzar, Htun Eaindra Bo and Khine Thin Kyi. The film, produced by Aung Khit Min Film Production premiered Myanmar on June 23, 2017.

Cast
Kyaw Htet Aung as Nyi Thuta / Yu Ya Maung / Sue Sha Ko Ko
Yan Aung as Shwe Thein Maung
Ye Aung as Htoo Sein
Min Oo as Dr. Ngwe La Yaung
Soe Myat Thuzar as Moe Khin Khin
Htun Eaindra Bo as Nway Oo May
Khine Thin Kyi as Saung Hay Man
Mari Cole as Police Woman

References

2017 films
2010s Burmese-language films
Burmese drama films
Films shot in Myanmar
2017 drama films